David Tůma (born June 4, 1991) is a Czech professional ice hockey player. He played with HC Sparta Praha in the Czech Extraliga during the 2010–11 Czech Extraliga season.

References

External links

1991 births
Czech ice hockey forwards
HC Sparta Praha players
Living people
Rytíři Kladno players
Sportspeople from Ústí nad Labem